is a Japanese writer known for her off-beat fiction, poetry, and literary criticism. She has won numerous Japanese literary awards, including the Akutagawa Prize, the Tanizaki Prize, the Yomiuri Prize, and the Izumi Kyōka Prize for Literature. Her work has been adapted for film, and has been translated into more than 15 languages.

Early life and education
Kawakami was born in Tokyo in 1958 and grew up in the Takaido neighborhood of Suginami City. She graduated from Ochanomizu Women's College in 1980.

Career
After graduating from college Kawakami began writing and editing for NW-SF, a Japanese science fiction magazine. Her first short story, "Sho-shimoku" ("Diptera"), appeared in NW-SF in 1980.
She also taught science in a middle school and high school, but became a housewife when her husband had to relocate for work. 

In 1994, at the age of 36, Kawakami debuted as a writer of literary fiction with a collection of short stories entitled Kamisama (God). In 1996 Hebi wo fumi (Tread on a snake) won the Akutagawa Prize, one of Japan's most prestigious literary awards. It was later translated into English under the title Record of a Night Too Brief. She received the Tanizaki Prize in 2001 for her novel Sensei no kaban (The Briefcase or Strange Weather in Tokyo), a love story about a friendship and romance between a woman in her thirties and her former teacher, a man in his seventies. After the Fukushima Daiichi nuclear disaster, Kawakami rewrote her debut short story "Kamisama" ("God"), keeping the original plot but incorporating the events of Fukushima into the story. 

In 2014 the film Nishino Yukihiko no Koi to Bōken, based on Kawakami's 2003 novel of the same name and starring Yutaka Takenouchi and Machiko Ono, was released nationwide in Japan. That same year Kawakami's novel  was published by Bungeishunjū. Suisei  won the 66th Yomiuri Prize in 2015, with selection committee member Yōko Ogawa praising the book for expanding the horizon of literature. In 2016 Kawakami's book , a collection of 14 short stories published by Kodansha, won the 44th Izumi Kyōka Prize for Literature.

Writing style
Kawakami's work explores emotional ambiguity by describing the intimate details of everyday social interactions. Many of her stories incorporate elements of fantasy and magical realism. Her writing has drawn comparisons to Lewis Carroll and Banana Yoshimoto, and she has cited Gabriel García Márquez and J. G. Ballard as influences. Many of her short stories, novel extracts, and essays have been translated into English, including "God Bless You" ("Kamisama"), "The Moon and the Batteries" (extract from Sensei no kaban), "Mogera Wogura",  "Blue Moon", "The Ten Loves of Nishino"., and People in My Neighborhood.

Awards and honors
1996 Akutagawa Prize for Hebi wo fumu (Tread on a Snake)
1999 Murasaki Shikibu Prize for Kamisama (God's Bear)
2000 Itō Sei Literature Prize for Oboreru
2000 Woman Writer's Prize for Oboreru
2001 Tanizaki Prize for Sensei no kaban
2007 57th MEXT Minister's Award for Literature
2012 Man Asian Literary Prize shortlist for The Briefcase (Sensei no kaban)
2014 Independent Foreign Fiction Prize shortlist for Strange Weather in Tokyo (Japanese; trans. Allison Markin Powell)
2015 66th Yomiuri Prize for 
2016 44th Izumi Kyōka Prize for Literature for 
2019 Medal with Purple Ribbon

Film adaptation
 2014 Nishino Yukihiko no Koi to Bōken

Selected works

References

External links
https://web.archive.org/web/20070927045659/http://www.parisreview.com/viewmedia.php/prmMID/5482
http://thegodofbears.blogspot.com/2008/10/god-of-bears.html
 Hiromi Kawakami at J'Lit Books from Japan 
 Synopsis of Manazuru at JLPP (Japanese Literature Publishing Project) 
 Review of "Strange Weather in Tokyo", Booklover Book Reviews (English)

1958 births
Living people
Akutagawa Prize winners
Yomiuri Prize winners
Japanese women novelists
Recipients of the Medal with Purple Ribbon